Come Together: A Night for John Lennon's Words and Music is a 2001 television program tribute to John Lennon aired on both TNT and The WB.

Originally planned to celebrate Lennon's accomplishments, the concert took place on October 2, 2001, at Radio City Music Hall in New York City, shortly after the September 11 attacks and exactly one week before the 61st anniversary of Lennon's birth. It was dedicated to "New York City and its people" and presented as a fundraiser for the Robin Hood Foundation.

The concert was named for Lennon's Beatles song, "Come Together".

Participants
Well-known people performed John Lennon songs and spoke about him, including Yoko Ono, Yolanda Adams, Marc Anthony, Beck, Edie Falco, Nelly Furtado, James Gandolfini, Dustin Hoffman, Cyndi Lauper, Sean Lennon, Shelby Lynne, Dave Matthews, Moby, Shaggy, Alanis Morissette, Billy Preston, Lou Reed, Stone Temple Pilots and Rufus Wainwright. The program also features interview and performance clips of Lennon.

The program was hosted by Kevin Spacey, who also performed one of Lennon's songs, "Mind Games".

Performances
All songs were written and composed by Lennon, except where noted, 

 "Imagine" - Yolanda Adams and Billy Preston
 "In My Life" (Lennon/McCartney) - Dave Matthews'''
 "Revolution" (Lennon/McCartney) - Stone Temple Pilots
 "Dear Prudence" (Lennon/McCartney) - Alanis Morissette
 "Across the Universe" (Lennon/McCartney) - Moby, Sean Lennon and Rufus Wainwright
 "Strawberry Fields Forever" (Lennon/McCartney) - Cyndi Lauper
 "Lucy in the Sky with Diamonds" (Lennon/McCartney) - Marc Anthony
 "Mother" - Shelby Lynne
 "Instant Karma!" - Nelly Furtado and Dave Stewart
 "Jealous Guy" - Lou Reed
 "Nowhere Man" (Lennon/McCartney) - Natalie Merchant
 "Mind Games" - Kevin Spacey
 "Come Together" (Lennon/McCartney) - Craig David
 "This Boy" (Lennon/McCartney) - Sean Lennon, Rufus Wainwright and Robert Schwartzman
 "Julia" (Lennon/McCartney) - Sean Lennon
 "Give Peace a Chance"/"Power to the People" - Ensemble

References

External links
Come Together: A Night for John Lennon's Words and Music in Internet Movie Database (IMDb)

John Lennon
2000s American television specials
Benefit concerts in the United States
Concert films
Musical tributes to the Beatles
2001 television specials